Come Date with Me is a reality dating show that debuted in the UK as a spinoff of Come Dine with Me. The show is a competitive dining and dating show, featuring one single girl and four eligible bachelors battling to become her dream date.

United Kingdom
The original British show screens on Channel 4. The dates range from flirty dinner parties to a trip to the spa, wine tasting with cheesy one-liners, ice skating or nude life drawing.

Canada
A Canadian version of the show aired in 2012. It consisted of 10 episodes and aired on W Network. The Cassanovas must cook for their prospective and their fellow Cassanovas.

Australia
An Australian version of the show was set to air on Network Ten in 2012, but was then delayed. It eventually screened on Eleven from 8 December 2013 until 15 January 2014.

References

British television spin-offs
British dating and relationship reality television series
Channel 4 original programming
2010s British reality television series

Television series by Proper Television
2010s Canadian reality television series
2012 Canadian television series debuts
2012 Canadian television series endings

Australian dating and relationship reality television series
10 Peach original programming
2013 Australian television series debuts
2014 Australian television series endings
Come Dine With Me
W Network original programming